Thomas Martin Ryan Jr. (born December 10, 1928) is a retired United States Air Force general who served as the commander of Air Training Command (COMATC) from 1981 to 1983 and as Commander in Chief of the Military Airlift Command (CINCMAC) from 1983 to 1985.

Early life and education
Ryan was born on December 10, 1928, in Detroit, Michigan, and graduated from Ridgewood High School in Ridgewood, New Jersey, in 1946. He received a Bachelor of Science degree in military science from the University of Omaha in 1965, and a Master of Science degree in international affairs from The George Washington University, Washington, D.C., in 1968. He graduated from the Armed Forces Staff College at Norfolk, Virginia, in 1965 and from the Air War College at Maxwell Air Force Base, Alabama, in 1968.

Career

Ryan became an aviation cadet in September 1949, and after completing pilot training at Reese Air Force Base, Texas, he was commissioned a second lieutenant in October 1950. He then served in various flying assignments with the Strategic Air Command at Barksdale Air Force Base, Louisiana; Ramey Air Force Base, Puerto Rico; and Hunter Air Force Base, Georgia, until July 1953 when he entered observer training school at Ellington and James Connally Air Force bases, Texas.

From May 1954 to June 1962, he was assigned to Forbes Air Force Base, Kansas, as a B-47 pilot, select crew aircraft commander, instructor pilot and squadron operations officer. In 1958 he became a standardization evaluator in the 90th Strategic Reconnaissance Wing.

Ryan transferred to SAC headquarters at Offutt Air Force Base, Nebraska, in June 1962 as a staff officer in the Plans and Organizational Section of the Weapons Management Branch, Weapons Maintenance Division. In February 1965 he entered the Armed Forces Staff College and following graduation in July 1965 he joined the SR-71 equipped 4200th Strategic Reconnaissance Wing at Beale Air Force Base, California, where he served as chief of the Quality Control Division and later as chief of the Maintenance Control Division.

In July 1968 he graduated from the Air War College and then attended RF-4C combat crew training at Shaw Air Force Base, South Carolina. In March 1969 he was assigned to the 432nd Tactical Reconnaissance Wing at Udorn Royal Thai Air Force Base, Thailand, as a maintenance control officer and later as chief of maintenance. During this tour of duty he flew 114 combat missions in RF-4C's.

Upon his return to the United States, Ryan served on the staff of the inspector general, Headquarters U.S. Air Force, Washington, D.C., from April 1970 to June 1971. He then transferred to Wurtsmith Air Force Base, Michigan, as vice commander and then commander of the 379th Bombardment Wing. During 1972 and 1973, he completed a temporary tour of duty as commander, 303rd Consolidated Aircraft Maintenance Wing at Andersen Air Force Base, Guam, and participated in the Linebacker II campaign against North Vietnam in December 1972.

He assumed duties as commander of the 47th Air Division with headquarters at Fairchild Air Force Base, Washington, in July 1973. Ryan was again assigned to SAC headquarters in January 1974 as assistant deputy chief of staff for logistics and in January 1975 become the deputy chief of staff for logistics.

He returned to Air Force headquarters in April 1976 as director for logistics plans and programs, and in July 1977 become the deputy chief of staff for systems and logistics. From October 1977 to July 1981, Ryan served as vice commander in chief of the Military Airlift Command at Scott Air Force Base. He then became commander of Air Training Command at Randolph Air Force Base, Texas. He assumed command of Military Airlift Command in June 1983.

Ryan is a command pilot with more than 8,000 flying hours. His military decorations and awards include the Defense Distinguished Service Medal, Air Force Distinguished Service Medal, Legion of Merit, Distinguished Flying Cross, Bronze Star Medal, Air Medal with six oak leaf clusters and Air Force Commendation Medal with three oak leaf clusters.

Ryan was promoted to general August 1, 1981, with date of rank July 31, 1981.

Awards and decorations

Later life
Ryan retired from the U.S. Air Force on September 30, 1985.

In 2011 he was inducted into the Airlift/Tanker Association Hall of Fame.

References

External links

1928 births
Living people
United States Air Force personnel of the Vietnam War
Elliott School of International Affairs alumni
Military personnel from Detroit
People from Ridgewood, New Jersey
Recipients of the Air Force Distinguished Service Medal
Recipients of the Air Medal
Recipients of the Defense Distinguished Service Medal
Recipients of the Distinguished Flying Cross (United States)
Recipients of the Legion of Merit
Recipients of the Order of the Sword (United States)
Ridgewood High School (New Jersey) alumni
United States Air Force generals
University of Nebraska Omaha alumni